Cypridoidea is a superfamily of ostracods in the suborder Cypridocopina.

Taxonomy
The following families are recognised in the superfamily Cypridoidea:
 Candonidae 
 †Cyprideidae 
 Cyprididae 
 Ilyocyprididae 
 Notodromadidae 
 †Quadracyprididae 
 †Trapezoidellidae 
Unassigned taxa:
 Genus †Pythagoracypris
 Genus †Schneideria

See also
Bennelongia

References

Podocopida
Arthropod superfamilies